The Greatest Jazz Concert in the World is a 1967 live album featuring Duke Ellington and his orchestra, Ella Fitzgerald, Oscar Peterson, T-Bone Walker, Coleman Hawkins, Clark Terry and Zoot Sims. It was released in 1975.

Billy Strayhorn's "Blood Count" was debuted at the Carnegie Hall concert featured on the album. It was Strayhorn's last composition; he died a few months after the piece was recorded. 

The album marked the last recorded collaboration between Fitzgerald and Ellington and his orchestra.

The album contains the last recordings of Coleman Hawkins. During the opening of "Sweet Georgia Brown" Hawkins can be heard to say "I guess I've gotta go through with it". Then someone replies "That's right".

Reception

The AllMusic review by Scott Yanow noted: "In addition to having a somewhat immodest title, this three-CD set was not actually one single concert but two...the music on the reissue is often quite special...Maybe this really was 'the Greatest Jazz Concert' after all".

Track listing
Disc One
 "Smedley" (Oscar Peterson) – 4:16
 "Some Day My Prince Will Come" (Frank Churchill, Larry Morey) – 4:59
 "Daytrain" (Peterson) – 5:53
 "Now's the Time" (Charlie Parker) – 8:26
 "Memories of You" (Eubie Blake, Andy Razaf) – 2:22
 "Misty" (Johnny Burke, Erroll Garner) – 2:45
 "I Can't Get Started" (Vernon Duke, Ira Gershwin) – 2:26
 "Wee Dot" (J.J. Johnson, Leo Parker) – 9:49
 "Moonglow" (Eddie DeLange, Will Hudson, Irving Mills) – 3:29
 "Sweet Georgia Brown" (Ben Bernie, Kenneth Casey, Maceo Pinkard) – 4:28
 "C Jam Blues" (Barney Bigard, Duke Ellington) – 6:12
 "Woman, You Must Be Crazy" (T-Bone Walker) – 9:08
 "Stormy Monday" (Walker) – 6:40
Disc Two
 "Swamp Goo" (Ellington) – 4:54
 "Girdle Hurdle" (Ellington) – 2:51
 "The Shepherd" (Ellington) – 6:33
 "Rue Bleue" (Ellington) – 2:44
 "Salome" (Raymond Fol) – 3:34
 "A Chromatic Love Affair" (Ellington) – 3:58
 "Mount Harissa" (Ellington, Billy Strayhorn) – 6:39
 "Blood Count" (Strayhorn) – 3:50
 "Rockin' in Rhythm" (Harry Carney, Ellington, Mills) – 3:40
 "Very Tenor" (Ellington) – 7:51
 "Onions (Wild Onions)" (Ellington) – 2:55
 "Take the "A" Train" (Strayhorn) – 5:29
Disc Three
 "Satin Doll" (Ellington, Johnny Mercer, Strayhorn) – 5:25
 "Tootie for Cootie" (Ellington, Jimmy Hamilton) – 6:45
 "Up Jump" (Ellington) – 3:38
 "Prelude to a Kiss" (Ellington, Mack Gordon, Mills) – 4:39
 "Mood Indigo"/"I Got It Bad (and That Ain't Good)" (Bigard, Ellington, Mills)/(Ellington, Paul Francis Webster) – 6:08
 "Things Ain't What They Used to Be" (Mercer Ellington, Ted Persons) – 4:31
 "Don't Be That Way" (Benny Goodman, Mitchell Parish, Edgar Sampson) – 4:09
 "You've Changed" (Bill Carey, Carl T. Fischer) – 4:12
 "Let's Do It (Let's Fall in Love)" (Cole Porter) – 4:38
 "On the Sunny Side of the Street" (Dorothy Fields, Jimmy McHugh) – 2:14
 "It's Only a Paper Moon" (Harold Arlen, Yip Harburg, Billy Rose) – 2:31
 "Day Dream" (Ellington, John La Touche, Strayhorn) – 4:49
 "If I Could Be with You (One Hour Tonight)" (Henry Creamer, James P. Johnson) – 3:18
 "Between the Devil and the Deep Blue Sea" (Harold Arlen, Ted Koehler) – 3:50
 "Cotton Tail" (Ellington) – 5:29

Disc One
Tracks 1-3: The Oscar Peterson trio
Tracks 4-8: Jam session with Sam Jones, Benny Carter, Bobby Durham, Zoot Sims and Paul Gonsalves
Tracks 9-10: Coleman Hawkins with the Oscar Peterson trio & Paul Gonsalves

Track 11: Jam session with Oscar Peterson, Sam Jones, Louis Hayes, Coleman Hawkins, Johnny Hodges and Benny Carter
Tracks 12-13: T-Bone Walker with Oscar Peterson, Clark Terry , Sam Jones, Bobby Durham, Coleman Hawkins, Johnny Hodges and Benny Carter
Disc Two
Tracks 1-11: Duke Ellington and his orchestra
Track 12: Oscar Peterson with Duke Ellington and his orchestra
Disc Three
Tracks 1-6: Duke Ellington and his orchestra
Tracks 7-10: Ella Fitzgerald with the Duke Ellington orchestra
Tracks 11-14: Ella Fitzgerald with the Jimmy Jones trio
Track 15: Ella Fitzgerald with the Jimmy Jones trio and Duke Ellington orchestra

Personnel
 Ella Fitzgerald – vocals
 T–Bone Walker – vocals, guitar
 Clark Terry – trumpet
 Benny Carter – alto saxophone
 Coleman Hawkins – tenor saxophone
 Zoot Sims – tenor saxophone
 Bobby Durham – drums
 Louis Hayes – drums

Oscar Peterson trio
 Oscar Peterson – piano
 Sam Jones – double bass
 Bobby Durham – drums

Jimmy Jones trio
 Jimmy Jones – piano
 Bob Cranshaw – double bass
 Sam Woodyard – drums

Duke Ellington Orchestra
 Duke Ellington – piano
 Cat Anderson – trumpet
 Mercer Ellington – trumpet
 Herbie Jones – trumpet
 Cootie Williams – trumpet
 Buster Cooper – trombone
 Lawrence Brown – trombone
 Chuck Connors – bass trombone
 Jimmy Hamilton – saxophone
 Johnny Hodges – alto saxophone
 Russell Procope – alto saxophone
 Paul Gonsalves – tenor saxophone
 Harry Carney – baritone saxophone
 John Lamb – double bass
 Rufus "Speedy" Jones – drums

References

1967 live albums
Oscar Peterson live albums
Ella Fitzgerald live albums
Duke Ellington live albums
Clark Terry live albums
Benny Carter live albums
T-Bone Walker albums
Zoot Sims live albums
Coleman Hawkins live albums
Albums produced by Norman Granz
Albums recorded at the Hollywood Bowl
Albums recorded at Carnegie Hall
Pablo Records live albums